Timothy Lance Catalfo (born February 23, 1959) is an American former amateur wrestler, and mixed martial artist. A professional MMA competitor from 1997 until 2003, he competed for the PRIDE Fighting Championships and King of the Cage. He was voted as having the seventh-best facial hair in MMA history by hunglodojo.com

Early life
Raised in Montvale, New Jersey, Catalfo attended Pascack Hills High School, where he was New Jersey state wrestling champion in 1977 in the 148-pound weight class.

Career
Catalfo comes from a wrestling background; he finished in fourth place at the 1980 All-American Freestyle tournament and in 1st place at the Greco-Roman Games in 1987. After this, he became a professional wrestler with the World Championship Wrestling (WCW) organization. His nickname, "Obake", was given to him by Japanese pro wrestler Yuji Nagata, and is a Japanese folklore creature. Catalfo also used this name to found the "Obake Gym" one of MMA's first independent schools.

In September 1997, he debuted as a mixed martial artist and defeated his opponent Joe Pardo with a neck crank. He then went to Brazil to fight in the International Vale Tudo Championship where he won his bout via disqualification as his opponent Alexandre Ferreira eye gouged him. He returned to the cage three years later to face UFC veteran Dave Beneteau at King of the Cage 9: Showtime. Catalfo defeated Beneteau with a choke after just 25 seconds of the first round.

The PRIDE Fighting Championships of Japan then gave him the opportunity to fight there. He made his promotional debut in February 2002 against fellow wrestler Tom Erikson at PRIDE 19: Bad Blood. Erikson outweighed Catolfo by around 50 pounds and submitted him with relative ease at 2:25 of the first round. He had one more fight after this, submitting James Daniels at an event in Florida a year later.

Personal life
Catalfo is a licensed chiropractor.

Mixed martial arts record

|-
|Win
|align=center| 4-2
| James Daniels
| Submission (neck crank)
| World Extreme Fighting Championships 2: Crunch Time
|
|align=center|1
|align=center|1:19
|Jacksonville, Florida, United States
|
|-
|Loss
|align=center| 3-2
| Tom Erikson
| Submission (rear naked choke)
| PRIDE 19
|
|align=center|1
|align=center|2:25
|Saitama, Japan
||Super Heavyweight bout.
|-
|Loss
|align=center| 3-1
| Bobby Hoffman
| Submission (strikes)
| KOTC 11: Domination
|
|align=center|1
|align=center|3:56
|San Jacinto, California, United States
||
|-
|Win
|align=center| 3-0
| Dave Beneteau
| Submission (choke)
| KOTC 9: Showtime
|
|align=center|1
|align=center|0:25
|San Jacinto, California, United States
||
|-
|Win
|align=center| 2-0
| Alexandre Ferreira
| DQ (eye gouging)
| International Vale Tudo Championship 4: The Battle
|
|align=center|1
|align=center|9:19
|Brazil
||
|-
|Win
|align=center| 1-0
| Joe Pardo
| Submission (neck crank)
| International Sport Combat Federation: Submission Fighting Open 1
|
|align=center|N/A
|align=center|N/A
|Griffin, Georgia, United States
|

References

External links

1959 births
Living people
American male mixed martial artists
Mixed martial artists from Georgia (U.S. state)
Mixed martial artists from New Jersey
Heavyweight mixed martial artists
Mixed martial artists utilizing wrestling
American male sport wrestlers
American male professional wrestlers
Pascack Hills High School alumni
People from Montvale, New Jersey
Sportspeople from Bergen County, New Jersey